Nehomar Andrés Cermeño Febres (born June 7, 1979) is a Venezuelan professional boxer who held the WBA (Regular) super bantamweight title from 2016 to 2017. He also held the WBA interim titles at bantamweight and super bantamweight between 2009 and 2014. As an amateur, Cermeño represented Venezuela at the 2000 Olympics as a bantamweight, reaching the Round of 16.

Olympic results
Defeated Riaz Durgahed (Mauritius) 16-4
Lost to Agasi Agaguloglu (Turkey) 3-11

Professional career

Cermeno vs. Mijares 
Cermeño turned professional on November 13, 2004. In 2009, he scored a major upset by defeating Cristian Mijares to win the WBA bantamweight interim title. He later beat Mijares in a rematch. In 2010 Cermeno lost both of his two bids to defeat world champion Anselmo Moreno.

Cermeno vs. Escandon 
In 2013, Cermeño defeated Óscar Escandón by split decision to win the WBA super bantamweight interim title.

Cermeno vs. Xiaojun 
After being stripped of the title due to inactivity, Cermeño returned in 2015 and won his first full world title by defeating Qiu Xiaojun to win the super bantamweight WBA regular title.

Cermeno vs. Kubo 
Shun Kubo beat Nehomar Cermeno via technical knockout in the 11th round on 9 April 2017.

Cermeno vs. Xu 
Cermeno fought Can Xu on 3 October 2017. Can Xu was ranked #2 by the WBA at featherweight. Xu beat Cermeno by technical knockout in the 7th round.

Professional boxing record

References

 sports-reference

External links
 
 Nehomar Cermeno - Profile, News Archive & Current Rankings at Box.Live

  

1979 births
Living people
Bantamweight boxers
Super-bantamweight boxers
World Boxing Association champions
Boxers at the 1999 Pan American Games
Boxers at the 2003 Pan American Games
Boxers at the 2000 Summer Olympics
Olympic boxers of Venezuela
People from Barcelona, Venezuela
Venezuelan male boxers
Pan American Games silver medalists for Venezuela
Pan American Games medalists in boxing
Central American and Caribbean Games bronze medalists for Venezuela
South American Games gold medalists for Venezuela
South American Games medalists in boxing
Competitors at the 2002 South American Games
Competitors at the 1998 Central American and Caribbean Games
Competitors at the 2002 Central American and Caribbean Games
Central American and Caribbean Games medalists in boxing
Medalists at the 1999 Pan American Games
20th-century Venezuelan people
21st-century Venezuelan people